Lou Karbiener is a retired American soccer defender who played professionally in the American Soccer League and USISL.

He was a 1982 First Team All American. In December 1982, the Tulsa Roughnecks selected Karbiener in the second round of the North American Soccer League draft. The Denver Avalanche of the Major Indoor Soccer League also drafted him. However, he elected to retain his amateur eligibility in order to play for the U.S. Olympic team at the 1984 Summer Olympics. Although he played for the Olympic team in 1983 and 1984, he was dropped by the U.S. team when the International Olympic Committee announced that professionals could play in the tournament. In 1986, he played for the amateur Orlando Lions. In 1988, the team turned professional and entered the American Soccer League. He remained with the Lions through the 1990 season, during which the Lions played in the American Professional Soccer League. In 1992, a new team using the name Orlando Lions entered the USISL. Karbiener signed with this version of the Lions as well.

References

1961 births
Living people
All-American men's college soccer players
American soccer players
American Professional Soccer League players
American Soccer League (1988–89) players
Association football defenders
Orlando Lions players
Orlando Lions (1992–1996) players
Penn State Nittany Lions men's soccer players
USISL players